The Class 660 was a class of steam tender locomotives with 2-6-2 wheel arrangement operated by the Chōsen Railway (Chōtetsu) in colonial Korea.

Description
With the completion of the Ryesong River bridge in 1932, the importance of Chōtetsu's Hwanghae Line grew significantly, and by 1935 the company was looking at the possibility - unusual for a narrow-gauge railway - of running limited express trains on the line between Gyeongseong and Haeju.

Designated Class 660, six were built at the end of 1937 by Kisha Seizō (road numbers 660-663, works numbers 1490-1492) and Nippon Sharyō (road numbers 663-665) of Japan.

Postwar
After the Liberation and partition of Korea, these locomotives were divided between the Korean State Railway of North Korea and the Korean National Railroad of South Korea. None are known to survive.

References

Locomotives of Korea
Locomotives of North Korea
Locomotives of South Korea
Railway locomotives introduced in 1937
2-6-2 locomotives
Kisha Seizo locomotives
Nippon Sharyo locomotives
Narrow gauge steam locomotives of Korea
Chosen Railway